The University of Georgia College of Veterinary Medicine is a college within the University of Georgia (UGA) in Athens, Georgia, United States and is a top 10 ranked veterinary school.

History
A comprehensive history of the College, The Year of the Jubilee, was compiled and written in 2000 by J.T. Mercer and Robert Duncan. Most of the information written here is taken from that history.

The College opened in 1946. The first laboratories were housed in Hardman Hall, which had previously been used as a livestock judging pavilion and later as a Navy warehouse. The school graduated its first class of 44 students in 1950, the year it was accredited.

In 1951, the vet school's first permanent building was opened to house the school and clinics. In 1970, the Board of Regents approved a name change from the School of Veterinary Medicine to the College of Veterinary Medicine, reflecting the expansion of the College's graduate, research and service programs.

Construction on a new wing for The Institute of Comparative Medicine (ICM) began in 1971. The Athens Diagnostic Laboratory opened in two small rooms on the first floor of the College in July 1972, and later that year, the building that now houses the Community Practice Clinic also was built. The current Teaching Hospital building was completed for occupation in 1979. The state-of-the-art Animal Health Research Center was completed in 2006. $7.7 million in planning funds for a new Veterinary Medical Learning Center (which will include a new, expanded teaching hospital facility) were approved by the Georgia General Assembly in April 2010 (Athens Banner-Herald, May 2, 2010).

The College's inaugural Veterinary Conference was held in May 1964, and the College's 51st consecutive Annual Conference and Alumni Reunion was held on March 28–29, 2014.

The College began construction of the Veterinary Medicine Learning Center in March 2013.

The new campus is UGA’s third Athens campus, counting the main campus and the recently added Health Sciences Campus in Athens’ Normaltown neighborhood. The project includes a small and large animal teaching hospital, faculty offices, research labs and an academic learning center that houses classrooms and a conference area. At about 300,000 square feet, the one and two-story Veterinary Medical Learning Center is about 50 percent bigger than UGA’s Miller Learning Center, slightly more than 200,000 square feet.

In its 2019 Best Veterinary Schools rankings published in 2020, U.S. News & World Report ranked the College in the top ten of all veterinary schools.

Departments
Over 173 faculty are members of the following departments of the veterinary college:
 Animal Resources
 Diagnostic Laboratories
 Educational Resources
 Infectious Diseases
 Large Animal Medicine & Surgery
 Pathology
 Physiology & Pharmacology
 Population Health
 Poultry Diagnostic and Research Center
 Small Animal Medicine & Surgery
 Southeastern Cooperative Wildlife Disease Study (SCWDS)
 Teaching Hospital
 Veterinary Biosciences and Diagnostic Imaging

Degrees offered

Graduate degrees
The following graduate degrees are offered by the veterinary college:
 Master of Avian Medicine (M.A.M.) (D.V.M. is a prerequisite for this degree)
 Master of Avian Health and Medicine (M.A.H.M.) (D.V.M. is a prerequisite for this degree)
 Master of Food Animal Health and Management (M.F.A.M.)
 Master of Science (M.S.) and a P.D. in Veterinary and Biomedical Sciences, designed to emphasize interdisciplinary approaches in biomedical research.
 Doctor of Veterinary Medicine (D.V.M.)
 Ph.D. in Infectious Diseases
 Ph.D. in Pathology (D.V.M. is a prerequisite for this degree)
 Ph.D. in Pharmacology
 Ph.D. in Physiology
 Ph.D. in Toxicology

The UGA College of Veterinary Medicine also offers the Veterinary Medical Scientist Training Program (VMSTP) in which students simultaneously earn D.V.M. and Ph.D. degrees, and a DVM-MPH dual-degree program in which students earn the D.V.M. and Master of Public Health degrees.

Students
2014-2015 Student Enrollment
 DVM Candidates: 426
 17% minority

Other degree candidates: 166
 67 Ph.D. students
 23 master's degree students
 5 master's in avian medicine students
 7 master's in avian health and medicine students
 2 master’s in food animal health students
 4 DVM/MPH (master's in public health) students
 9 DVM/Ph.D. (Veterinary Medical Scientist Training Program) students
 15 clinical interns
 34 residents

Josiah Meigs Distinguished Teaching Professorship Award winners
 James Moore, Large Animal Medicine, 2012
 Karen Cornell, Small Animal Medicine and Surgery, 2011
 Wan-I Oliver Li, Physiology and Pharmacology, 2011
 Paige Carmichael, Pathology, 2006
 Corrie Brown, Pathology, 2004
 Scott A. Brown, Small Animal Medicine and Surgery, 2003
 Cynthia Trim, Large Animal Medicine, 2003
 P. Thomas Purinton, Anatomy & Radiology, 2001
 Linda Medleau, Small Animal Medicine & Surgery, 2000
 Michelle Henry Barton, Large Animal Medicine, 1999
 Jeanne A. Barsanti, Small Animal Medicine & Surgery, 1998

References

 UGA College of Veterinary Medicine
 UGA CVM Facts and Figures page
 Undergraduate and professional degrees offered by the University of Georgia, UGA Bulletin
 UGA Graduate School degrees, searchable by school
 Various Josiah Meigs Distinguished Teaching Professorship Award Winners from the College of Veterinary Medicine
 / Athens Banner-Herald, May 2, 2010

Veterinary Medicine
Educational institutions established in 1946
Veterinary schools in the United States
1946 establishments in Georgia (U.S. state)